Japan Evangelical Association (JEA) is a national evangelical alliance, member of the World Evangelical Alliance.

Member denominations
Immanuel General Mission
The Salvation Army
Evangelical Free Church of Japan
Japan Holiness Church
Living Christ One Ear of Wheat Church
Zion Christian Church (Japan)
Japan Evangelistic Band
The Biblical Church
Japan Assemblies of God

External links
日本福音同盟 - Japan Evangelical Association 
日本福音同盟記録誌
『はばたく日本の福音派―日本福音同盟10周年記念―』

Evangelicalism in Japan
National evangelical alliances
Christian organizations established in 1968
Christian evangelical denominations in Japan